Silent Ghungroos is a 2006 Indian documentary film directed by Gauri Warudi. The film is about Tamasha, the folk musical theatre of Maharashtra, and traces its origins to the Peshwa era. Tamasha has been the source of entertainment and amusement for the rural Marathi audience for more than a century. It was made by a Pune-based journalist turned documentary film maker.

Production
The film was shot in various places in Maharashtra, especially Narayangaon, where Tamasha originated, and two Tamasha festivals were shot there.

Made in digital format, using PD 150, a very basic digital movie camera, the film has English narration and dubbing for a mass appeal. Marathi and Hindi versions have also been made for different audiences.

Reception
Silent Ghungroos won the IDPA-Nautanki.tv Online Award in 2007, for the best documentary film.

Screenings
Silent Ghungroos was screened at several film festivals internationally and domestic, viz
 Koodu Women Director’S Film Festival, Madurai, India
 Golden Gate Film Festival, San Francisco, Usa
 Cape Town Bollywood Film Festival, South Africa.

Also screened at independent events in India:
Patrakar Bhavan, Pune, Pu. La Deshpande Film Fest, Pune, Idpa-Nautanki.Tv Online Competition, Itc—Hyderabad and Centre For Films And Drama, Bangalore

References

External links
 
 Silent Ghungroos, Online

Indian documentary films
2006 documentary films
2006 films
Documentary films about theatre
Culture of Maharashtra
Films about musical theatre
2000s English-language films